Obereopsis insignis is a species of beetle in the family Cerambycidae. It was described by Per Olof Christopher Aurivillius in 1907. It is known from the Ivory Coast, Guinea, and Togo.

References

insignis
Beetles described in 1907